The Amei class (アメイ) was a class of steam tender locomotives of the Chosen Government Railway (Sentetsu) with 4-4-0 wheel arrangement. The "Ame" name came from the American naming system for steam locomotives, under which locomotives with 4-4-0 wheel arrangement were called "American".

Description
Sentetsu introduced the Amei class locomotives in 1911, receiving six from ALCo of the United States. Unlike the Tehoi class locomotives, the Amei class were equipped with a four-axle tender. They were found to offer no advantage over the Teho types or Sorii class, and no further 4-4-0 locomotives were ever ordered by Sentetsu.

Sentetsu put them into service on the "Ryūki" express, Korea's first express train, operating between Sinuiju and Busan via Gyeongseong,  along the Gyeongui Line between Sinuiju and Gyeongseong. Their original numbers are unknown, but they were numbered 401 through 406 in 1918, and then became アメイ1 through アメイ6 numbers in Sentetsu's general renumbering of 1938.

Postwar: Korean National Railroad 아메1 (Ame1) class
After the Liberation of Korea, all six Amei-class locomotives remained in South Korea, where they were designated 아메1 class by the Korean National Railroad.

Construction

References

Locomotives of Korea
Locomotives of South Korea
Railway locomotives introduced in 1911
4-4-0 locomotives
ALCO locomotives